The 1922 Stanford football team represented Stanford University in the 1922 college football season. They were coached by Andy Kerr in his first season as head coach. For the first time, the team played all its home games at Stanford Stadium, the construction of which had been completed at the end of the previous season. With construction of California Memorial Stadium beginning, Stanford hosted the Big Game for the second straight year, the only time the game was played in successive seasons at Stanford Stadium.

Schedule

References

Stanford
Stanford Cardinal football seasons
Stanford football